The Melanesian Championships in athletics records are the best marks set by athletes who are representing one of the member states of the Melanesian Championships Council during the correspondent athletics event which began in 2001.

Men
Key:

Women
Key:

References

Melanesian Championships in Athletics
Melanesian Championships